Balasun Tea Estate  is a tea garden in the Kurseong CD block in the Kurseong subdivision of the Darjeeling district in the Indian state of West Bengal.

History
It was started in 1871 by Devenport & Company Limited as Nahore Balasun Tea Estate. It was renamed Balasun Tea Estate after the Balason that flows past the tea estate. In 1963, it was taken over by the Darjeeling Consolidated Tea Company Limited of the Bajoria Group. Jay Shree Tea & Industries Ltd. took it over in 2005.

Geography

The garden
Balasun Tea Estate is located near Sonada.

Balasun Tea Estate is planted with 51% pure China, 40% hybrid Assam and 9% Darjeeling Quality Clonal variety.

Note: The map alongside presents some of the notable locations in the subdivision. All places marked in the map are linked in the larger full screen map.

Economy
Balasun Tea Estate produces 100,000 kg organic Darjeeling tea annually. 

It is Hazard Analysis & Critical Control Point (HACCP) certified by TUV-NORD, UTZ certified by IMO and SAN/ Rainforest Alliance certification from IMO and has Fair Trade certification from FLO-CERT. 

The other tea gardens of the Jay Shree Tea & Industries  Ltd., owned by the B.K.Birla group, in Darjeeling are: Puttabong (Tukvar) Tea Estate, Sungma Tea Garden, North Tukvar Tea Estate, Singbulli Tea Garden and Rishihat Tea Garden.

References

External links
 

Tea estates in Darjeeling district